Mandy Lieu (born March 20, 1985) is a Malaysian-American model, actress, and TV show host based in Hong Kong and currently residing in the United Kingdom. She has appeared in Hong Kong television shows and movies such as Horseplay and To the Fore.

Early life

Mandy Lieu's father is a white American and he disappeared before she was born. Her mother is Malaysian-Chinese and unemployed at that time. Lieu and her younger brother grew up in a single parent household in Malaysia and moved to Kuala Lumpur with her family when she was 8. She worked as a part-time model during her free time. In 2003, she went to Hong Kong to develop her modelling career after dropping out of school and she had appeared in television advertisements.

Career

Model 
Mandy Lieu rose to fame in a shampoo commercial in Malaysia, which led a new chapter in her life. She then moved to Tokyo at age 17, one year later she arrived in Hong Kong. She repeatedly and frequently featured on the cover of many magazines, including More, Me, HIM, Marie Claire, Fashion & Beauty, Wedding Deluxe, Ketchup, Darizi, Elle Wedding. Lieu face has been used as the face of many campaigns, like Hugo Boss, TAG Heuer Watch, Max & Co., Salvatore Ferragamo, Marc by Marc Jacobs, Dior, Omega to HK Fashion Week, Ted Baker, Miu Miu, Mulberry, Shiseido, and Swarovski.

Acting 
In 2012, Mandy broke into film by playing a supporting role in Tai Chi 0.  Her career path keep expanding with box-office successes like Black & White: The Dawn of Justice (2014) and To the Fore (2015).

Personal life
Growing up in multicultural country, Mandy Lieu is multilingual and can speak Malay, Cantonese, Mandarin, English, and Japanese.

Mandy Lieu stated that she does not officially have a Chinese name despite the rumour that her Chinese name is 劉碧麗. She said that 劉碧麗 is a name created by netizens, and she later accepted this name as it became too widespread.

In 2020, Mandy Lieu bought Ewhurst Park estate, near Basingstoke, with the intent to change the 925-acre estate to produce food for her restaurant and rewild parts of it.  In 2023, a pair of beavers to be released on the grounds, thereby reintroducing beavers in Hampshire, where they became extinct 400 years ago.

Relationship
Mandy Lieu dated Bolin Chen for three years before they broke up in 2011. She gave birth to a daughter on 20 May 2015 fathered by the already married Macau casino tycoon Alvin Chau (Chau Cheok Wa's). Mandy Lieu had dated Alvin Chau for over five years but it ended when he refused to divorce his wife Heidi Chan. Subsequently, Alvin Chau paid her HK$300 million (RM158 million) as a “breakup fee” in November 2019.

Filmography

Television
2008: Dressage to Win

Master of Ceremonies
2010: Mr. Hong Kong
2013: Asian Film Awards

Game Shows
2013: Super Trio Maximus
2014: The Conquerors (episode 10)
2014: Summer Splash (episodes 6–10)

Hostess
2009: Lifetival
2010: 老虎都要 party
2010: 日本‧不盡的享樂

Films
2012: Taichi 0
2012: Don Juan DeMarco
2014: The Splash Muses
2014: Horseplay
2014: Black & White: The Dawn of Justice
2015: To The Fore

References

External links

mandylieu's blog

  Mandy Lieu forum:)

Living people
1985 births
Chinese female models
Malaysian people of Chinese descent
Malaysian people of American descent
Malaysian female models
Hong Kong film actresses
Hong Kong television actresses
Hong Kong female models
21st-century Hong Kong actresses
Malaysian born Hong Kong artists